Yolanda Claire Quartey (born 31 July 1983), known professionally as Yola or Yola Carter, is an English singer-songwriter and musician. Her debut studio album Walk Through Fire (2019) received critical acclaim and earned her four Grammy Award nominations, including Best New Artist. Her follow-up, Stand for Myself (2021), received similar acclaim and earned her two more Grammy nominations. Yola made her acting debut in 2022, portraying "godmother of rock n roll" Sister Rosetta Tharpe in Baz Luhrman’s biopic Elvis.

Early and personal life 
Yola was born to a Ghanaian father and a Barbadian mother in Bristol, England. Her family tried to discourage her from music at a young age, as they thought it was an unrealistic career option. When Yola was just under 2 her father left her and her mother behind. A single parent struggling to stay afloat, her mother was against Yola's dream to be a singer. It wasn't until Yola went to grammar school she had her first taste of freedom and started to pursue music. She later went to university in London and used her student loan to stay afloat while making music. She ended up becoming a university drop out and was evicted due to being unable to pay her rent. Yola was homeless for six months in her 20s and spent a week begging on the streets before getting enough money to travel back to Bristol.

Career 
Yola first gained notice as a member of the Bristol band Phantom Limb; she was a member from 2005 to 2012 using the name Yolanda Quartey. That band released two albums. Yola has also performed as a guest vocalist and occasional songwriter for British musical acts like Sub Focus, Massive Attack, Bugz in the Attic, Ginger Wildheart, and Duke Dumont.

Yola decided to launch a solo career after the death of her mother in 2013. She released her first solo EP, Orphan Offering, in 2016. In February 2019, she released her debut album Walk Through Fire on Dan Auerbach's Easy Eye Sound label, to much acclaim. The album title references a fire which damaged Yola's home and she escaped. AllMusic called the album "an extraordinary record, one designed to be part of a grand musical tradition, and it contains enough emotion and imagination to earn its place within that lineage." Brittney McKenna of NPR Music's First Listen declared, "It's the work of an artist sure to stun audiences for years to come." The Wall Street Journal stated, "The album is an introduction to a seasoned, major vocalist that stands to be remembered as a breakthrough."

Walk Through Fire was written, recorded and produced at Dan Auerbach's Easy Eye Studio in Nashville.  Auerbach produced the record and assembled an all-star cast for its creation.  Most of the songwriting was a collaboration of Yola and Auerbach with contributions from Bobby Wood, Pat McLaughlin and Dan Penn.  The team of studio musicians included bassist Dave Roe, harmonica player Charlie McCoy, Mike Rojas, who contributed piano, harpsichord, vibraphone and more, along with former members of the Memphis Boys drummer Gene Crisman and Wood on piano.  Additional vocals were contributed by Vince Gill, Molly Tuttle, Ronnie McCoury and Stuart Duncan.  The album was recorded and engineered by M. Allen Parker.  Auerbach and Parker also mixed the project. In March 2019, Yola made her American television debut on CBS This Morning'''s Saturday Sessions segment, where she played selections from Walk Through Fire. She, alongside Sheryl Crow, contributed to two tracks on the debut album by The Highwomen.

Yola made a splash at the Newport Folk Festival 2019 with Rolling Stone proclaiming, "Yola became the single most sought-after voice at this year's festival. She played a triumphant side-stage show, served as an unofficial member of The Highwomen, and added her own vocals to performances by everyone from Dolly Parton to Dawes, who let the fast-rising singer take over for the entirety of their 2009 song "When You Call My Name." According to Glide Magazine, "People came from far and wide to hear Yola sing, either because they were enchanted by her excellent release from earlier this year Walk Through Fire, or because word of mouth had reached them that this was not to be missed."Walk Through Fire generated three nominations at the 62nd Grammy Awards in 2020. The album was nominated for Best Americana Album and the track "Faraway Look" was nominated for Best American Roots Song and Best American Roots Performance. Additionally, Yola was nominated for Best New Artist.

In February 2020, Variety announced that she had been cast to portray Sister Rosetta Tharpe  — "dubbed the Godmother of rock and roll" — in Australian director Baz Luhrmann's film Elvis, a biopic of Elvis Presley released in 2022. In December 2020, she was featured in Ringo Starr's single and video "Here's To The Nights", from his 2021 Zoom In EP.

In July 2021, Yola released her latest album titled Stand for Myself. Yola has stated the album's sound is genre fluid, incorporating sounds including symphonic soul, classic pop, disco, R&B, and rock. Yola has  stated the album is charts her path self actualization as well as  exploring the concept of thriving vs. surviving, grief, the freedom of decisiveness, allyship, and sensuality” according to Ebony Magazine. Opening track, “Barely Alive,” is about “minimizing of yourself, and what that does to you, what that feels like. That’s why it had to be the opener, because that’s how I started. I started being a token Black lady in a very, very white space.” The album closes with “Stand For Myself” which celebrates a moment “of absolute freedom,” when you “can start self actualizing and start living.” 

Yola wrote the album during the pandemic, and alongside song ideas she had been germinating for the last decade, including Grammy-nominated track, “Diamond Studded Shoes”, written with Aaron Lee Tasjan,  she developed and wrote the songs in collaboration with artist and songwriters Joy Oladokun, Liz Rose, Ruby Amanfu and Natalie Hemby. NPR proclaimed it the “best soul record of the past 20 years, New York Times stated, “an album made on her own terms”  and Rolling Stone praising her as “one of contemporary pop’s greatest singers, who just so happens to also be one of its sharpest songwriters.” 

On October 8, 2021, Yola opened at Madison Square Garden for Chris Stapleton. Yola has also performed at The Hollywood Bowl, Newport Folk Festival, NewPort Jazz Festival, Stage Coach and Coachella. To celebrate the launch of the album, Yola commenced her 2022 Stand For Myself Tour in Boston in February 2022, with opening performances by Jac Ross and Nick Connors; and in Nashville by Devon Gilfillian and Allison Russell. The tour continued with sell out dates at venues including New York's Webster Hall and D.C.'s historic Lincoln Theatre, with CBS News taping and broadcast the performance for a special CBS Saturday Sessions episode. Yola has regularly performed on late night TV shows from The Tonight Show to Jimmy Kimmel Live!. Yola appeared on CBS This Morning interviewed by Anthony Mason, and performed at Musicares Person Of The Year. Yola was also the first taping of Austin City Limits for its 46th season.

Yola performed for a number of charitable and public-awareness initiatives. This included an appearance at "Twitch Aid," alongside some of the world's biggest artists including: Rufus Wainwright and John Legend, raising funds for the World Health Organization. Yola has also contributed to Annie Lennox's charity The Circle, as well as Love Rocks  and CBS's Play On Benefit show for Why Hunger.

At the 65th Annual Grammy Awards, Yola was nominated for her seventh Grammy Award, when her performance of "Strange Things Happening Everyday" was nominated as part of the Elvis movie soundtrack. She performed at the 2022 American Music Awards on November 20, 2022. Ahead of the performance, Variety Magazine stated Yola was "set for a breakout" moment. Yola became an American Music Award winner when the Elvis movie soundtrack won the Favourite Soundtrack award. Yola was nominated at the 54th NAACP Image Awards, in the category of Outstanding Breakthrough Performance in a Motion Picture, for her portrayal of Sister Rosetta Tharpe in Elvis''.

Discography

Studio albums

Extended plays

Singles

As lead artist

As featured artist

Awards and nominations

References

External links 
 

1983 births
Living people
English women singer-songwriters
Musicians from Bristol
21st-century Black British women singers
English country singers
English soul singers
British people of Jamaican descent